Wilhelm Röpke (October 10, 1899 – February 12, 1966) was a German economist and social critic, best known as one of the spiritual fathers of the social market economy. A Professor of Economics, first in Jena, then in Graz, Marburg, Istanbul, and finally Geneva, Switzerland, Röpke theorised and collaborated to organise the post-World War II economic re-awakening of the war-wrecked German economy, deploying a program sometimes referred to as the sociological neoliberalism (compared to ordoliberalism, a more sociologically inclined variant of German liberalism).

With Alfred Müller-Armack and Alexander Rüstow (sociological neoliberalism) and Walter Eucken and Franz Böhm (ordoliberalism) he elucidated the ideas, which then were introduced formally by Germany's post-World War II Minister for Economics Ludwig Erhard, operating under Konrad Adenauer's Chancellorship. Röpke and his colleagues' economic influence therefore is considered largely responsible for enabling Germany's post-World War II "economic miracle". Röpke was also a historian and was nominated to the Nobel Prize in Literature in 1965.

Life
Röpke was born in to the family of a rural doctor. His parents were devout Protestants and politically liberal. From 1917 he studied law and economics at the universities of Göttingen, Tübingen and Marburg. In 1921 he defended his doctoral thesis, and in 1922 he successfully completed the habilitation procedure for his doctoral degree at the University of Marburg. In 1922 he received a professorship at the University of Jena, becoming the youngest professor in Germany. This was followed by a stay in the USA as a visiting professor for the Rockefeller Foundation, in 1928 an appointment at the University of Graz and in 1929 an appointment at the Philipps University in Marburg, where he worked until 1933 as a professor of political economy.

Röpke's opposition to the German National Socialist regime led him (with his family) in 1933 to emigrate to Istanbul, Turkey, where he taught until 1937, before accepting a position at the Graduate Institute of International and Development Studies in Geneva, where he lived until his death, in 1966.

Work
In his youth, Röpke was first inspired by socialism and afterwards by the Austrian School economist Ludwig von Mises. Despite this, the post-World War II economic liberation enabling Germany to once again lead Europe, which Röpke and his allies (Walter Eucken, Franz Böhm, Alfred Müller-Armack and Alexander Rüstow) were the intellectual muscle behind, occurred by implementing policy divergent to that advocated by Ludwig von Mises. Though the two men shared some beliefs in certain areas, Röpke & co. instead formed the school of ordoliberalism and advocated free trade but with more central bank and state influence than what Austrian School economists suggest is required. Unlike many mainstream Austrian School economists, Röpke and the ordoliberalists conceded that the market economy can be more disruptive and inhumane unless intervention is permitted a role to play.

Following Alexander Rüstow, Röpke concluded that free markets' vaunted efficiency and affluence can exact social and spiritual forfeits. In consequence, he envisioned a positive and more extensive role for the state, as rulemaker, enforcer of competition, and provider of basic social security.

During the Great Depression, Röpke argued in Crises and Cycles that a secondary deflation had to be combated through a fiscal reflation. It has been argued that the secondary deflation essentially is the same phenomenon that Taiwanese-American economist Richard C. Koo in later years has denoted as a balance sheet recession. In spite of this, however, Röpke remained a political decentralist and rejected Keynesian economics, deriding it as "a typically intellectual construction that forgets the social reality behind the integral calculus".

For Röpke, rights and moral habits (Sitte) were key elements which the Central Bank and State (opposed to the Market-Economy) needed to subtly help organise. With a "conforming" social, economic, and financial policy, the task of which is to protect the weak "beyond the market," to equalize interests, set rules of the game, and limit market power, Röpke strove for an economic order of "economic humanism," something which he also referred to as the "Third Way."

Röpke stood for a society and social policy in which human rights are given the highest importance. He believed that individualism must be balanced by a well-thought-out principle of sociality and humanity. Significantly, Röpke's economic thought is highly congruent with Catholic social teaching. As he grew older, Röpke increasingly appreciated the overall, general benefits of a society that embraces spirituality, particularly in contrast to societies where spirituality is marginalized or demonized.

Röpke is also known for his pro-apartheid views on South Africa. In 1964, he published South Africa: An Attempt at a Positive Appraisal, which argued that apartheid was justified because the ‘South African Negro’ was not only of ‘an utterly different race’ but ‘a completely different type and level of civilisation’. Taking a position opposed to many Western governments, Röpke also supported the 1965 unilateral declaration of independence of Rhodesia, the racially-segregated southern African territory, from the British Empire.

Influence
In particular, from 1930 to 1931, Röpke served on a government commission examining unemployment and, from 1947 to 1948, he served on Germany's post-World War II currency reform council. Furthermore, Röpke personally advised the Chancellor of (post-World War II) West Germany, Konrad Adenauer, and his Minister of Economics, Ludwig Erhard up until the late 1950s, and therefore is credited with contributing the intellectual backbone of the now famous German Economic "Miracle".

Occupying West Germany following the conclusion of World War II, the Western Allies (the US, Britain, and France) had continued to implement an economic policy of rationing as well as wage and price controls, coupled with the continued excessive printing of paper money. Production consequently collapsed and prominent businessmen once again became unwilling to accept the (relatively) worthless currency, triggering widespread shortages and the mainstreaming of a grey-market barter economy. Röpke's The Solution to the German Problem (1947) illuminated the negative implications of the Western Allies' continuing of Hitler's economic policies. Instead, Röpke proposed abolishing price controls and replacing the reichsmark with a sound, more trustworthy currency.

Accordingly, price and wage controls were then incrementally abolished and on June 21, 1948, the new Deutsche Mark was introduced. These long-range policy initiatives, however, spawned some civil unrest immediately following their implementation because of a consequent increase in unemployment. Despite these disturbances and stoically supported by Röpke's learned newspaper writings, the Minister of Economics Ludwig Erhard persevered with foresight, and this eventually amounted to "a great personal vindication for Röpke": Röpke and his allies had "made West Germany immune to communism".

He was president of the Mont Pelerin Society from 1961 to 1962. But as a result of a long quarrel with Friedrich August von Hayek he stepped down and terminated his membership in it.

Works
 Crises and Cycles (1936)
 International Economic Disintegration (1942)
 Civitas Humana (1944)
 The German Question (1946)
 The Social Crisis of Our Time (1950)
 International Order and Economic Integration (1959)
 A Humane Economy: The Social Framework of the Free Market (1960)
 Economics of the Free Society (1963)
 Against the Tide (1969); posthumous essay collection
 Two Essays by Wilhelm Roepke (1987)

See also
 Contributions to liberal theory
 Liberalism
 Liberalism in Germany

References

Further reading
 Becher, Phillip / Becker, Katrin / Rösch, Kevin / Seelig, Laura (2021). Ordoliberal White Democracy, Elitism, and the Demos: The Case of Wilhelm Röpke. In Democratic Theory. 8 (2). pp. 70–96.
 Slobodian, Quinn (2014). The World Economy and the Color Line: Wilhelm Röpke, Apartheid, and the White Atlantic. In German Historical Bulletin Institute Supplement. 10. pp. 61–87.

External links

 Wilhelm Röpke's Political Economy by Samuel Gregg
 The Social Market Economy – U.S. Library of Congress
 "How Different Were Ropke and Mises?" by Ivan Pongracic
 A biography of Röpke – by Shawn Ritenour
 Wilhelm Röpke – Library Collections (including his entire correspondence in original)  – Library of the Institute for Economic Policy, University of Cologne, Germany
 Wilhelm Röpke – Library Collections (German Page)  – Library of the Institute for Economic Policy, University of Cologne, Germany
 "Wilhelm Röpke: A Centenary Appreciation" by Richard M. Ebeling ("The Freedom: Ideas on Liberty," October 1999)
 
 Obituary, by Ludwig von Mises

1899 births
1966 deaths
20th-century scholars
Commanders Crosses of the Order of Merit of the Federal Republic of Germany
Emigrants from Nazi Germany to Switzerland
European conservative liberals
German anti-communists
German economists
German expatriates in Turkey
German male non-fiction writers
Academic staff of the Graduate Institute of International and Development Studies
Academic staff of Istanbul University
Ordoliberalism
People from Heidekreis
Academic staff of the University of Marburg
Member of the Mont Pelerin Society